Pizhou is a county-level city under the administration of Xuzhou, Jiangsu province, China. As of 2006 it had a population of 163,000; it borders the Shandong prefecture-level cities of Linyi to the northeast and Zaozhuang to the northwest.

History
The city was formerly called Pi County, and before that, Xiapi which was at one time the capital of the Zhou Dynasty (1046–256 BCE) vassal State of Pi. During the Han Dynasty (206 BCE–220 CE), Pi was a famous city. At the time of the Three Kingdoms Period, the city is known for the battle between Lü Bu and Cao Cao fought there. It is the location Lü Bu retreated to when under siege by Cao Cao at Xiaopei.  He first moved his family there and then he himself after being advised by Chen Gong.  It was here that Lü Bu was ultimately defeated at the Battle of Xiapi.

During World War II, the Battle of Taierzhuang took place in Tengzhou. In the Chinese Civil War, it was the scene of the Huaihai Campaign. The area is relatively impoverished when compared to the rest of Jiangsu Province. In October 2007, when its party secretary Li Lianyu returned as a delegate from the 17th Party Congress, the entire city was mobilized to greet him in an unprecedented display, drawing immense criticism.

Geography
Pizhou lies to the northeast of Xuzhou City at the intersection of the Grand Canal and Longhai Railway. To the north of Pizhou, there is the well-known Tai'erzhuang District of Zaozhuang City, Shandong Province.

Pizhou City is home to the longest Dawn redwood Metasequoia glyptostroboides avenue in the world. The avenue is approximately 60 km long with over one million trees.

Climate

Administrative divisions
In the present, Pizhou City has 24 towns.
24 towns

References

External links
Pizhou City English guide (Jiangsu.NET)

 
Cities in Jiangsu
County-level divisions of Jiangsu
Administrative divisions of Xuzhou